, also known as  and by his nickname Sexyama, is a Japanese mixed martial artist and judoka of Korean descent who won the gold medal at the 2001 Asian Championships for South Korea and for Japan at the 2002 Asian Games. A fourth-generation Japanese of Korean descent, he acquired Japanese nationality in 2001. He is the former K-1 HERO's Light Heavyweight Grand Prix Tournament Champion.

Judo career
Before his professional mixed martial arts career, Akiyama was a decorated Judoka. He began training in Judo at the age of three. He has also trained Karate, Boxing, Kick Boxing, Wrestling and also Submission Wrestling with Greg Jackson.

2001 Asian championships
Representing South Korea, Choo won the gold medal at the 2001 Asian Judo Championships.

2002 Asian Games
Representing Japan, Akiyama won the gold medal at the 2002 Asian Games defeating Ahn Dong-Jin of South Korea in the finals.

2003 World Judo Championships controversy
Akiyama defeated three opponents from France, Mongolia and Turkey to reach the semi-finals of the 81 kg Light Middleweight division. However, all three opponents claimed that Akiyama had a slippery judogi. Wearing a reserve gi, Akiyama lost two games in a row (semifinal and 3rd-place match) and missed the medal.

International Judo Federation referee director Juan Carlos Barcos said an examination of the gi found that the slippery texture was due to high humidity which prevailed in Osaka and a detergent used to wash the uniform. "At any moment, we did not have any doubt about fair play in the case. We are absolutely sure that Mr. Akiyama is correct," since he changed the jacket at the request of the jury, Barcos said.

Akiyama was also accused of wearing slippery gear by former world and Olympic champion Kenzo Nakamura when they fought at the world championship trials in 2002.

Mixed martial arts career

HERO'S
Akiyama's mixed martial arts debut was in the K-1 Premium 2004 Dynamite event on December 31, 2004, where he defeated boxer Francois Botha by armbar submission in the first round. His first defeat was to Jerome LeBanner, who knocked him out with knees in his second fight at the HERO'S 1 event on March 26, 2005, although LeBanner is a heavyweight that came into the fight at 262 pounds (119 kg), while Akiyama came into the fight at 189.5 pounds (86 kg). He has notable wins against Tokimitsu Ishizawa, Taiei Kin, Kestutis Smirnovas and Melvin Manhoef. Akiyama defeated Melvin Manhoef at the Hero's light-heavyweight Grand Prix 2006 final round, and gained the champion belt.

In K-1 Premium 2006 Dynamite, Akiyama fought the legendary Kazushi Sakuraba in the main event. During the match, Sakuraba called to the referee saying "[Akiyama is] Slippery!" Akiyama went on to win the match with a referee stoppage. This created a controversy amongst MMA fans in Japan, assuming Akiyama was using some sort of body oil or lubricant, banned in K-1 rules. But at this moment, Akiyama answered to questions about the oil in the interview as follows: "I have no idea why Sakuraba felt slippery. It may be my sweat, as I sweat a lot always and it often drips off my body."

On January 11, Akiyama and FEG (the parent company of K-1) held a press conference during which Akiyama said he used Olay lotion prior to the fight claiming that the lotion was used to treat a worn gi. Pre-fight footage also showed Akiyama casually applying six bottles of lotion to his body in his locker room. As a result, Akiyama was disqualified and his prize money was suspended. Akiyama himself was suspended indefinitely from HERO'S competition six days later. Public outcry against Akiyama did not cease however, and Nike was swamped with complaints when Akiyama was featured on a television commercial in Japan. Though Akiyama has admitted to applying cream to his skin, he has said that the purpose was not to gain an unfair advantage but to treat his dry skin. The fight was ruled a "No Contest".

Akiyama was cleared from his FEG-induced suspension and FEG announced that Akiyama would return to K-1 Hero's in Seoul, on October 28, 2007. His opponent was Denis Kang, who was the finalist of PRIDE Bushido Grand Prix 2006 and making his debut in Hero's. Though he was an underdog, Akiyama beat Kang by KO in the first round.

Yarennoka! fight
On December 31, 2007, Akiyama faced Kazuo Misaki at Yarennoka!. The rules of the match stated that kicks to the head of a downed opponent would not be allowed. Late in the first round Misaki knocked down Akiyama with left hook, and as Akiyama struggled to his feet, Misaki delivered a lunging kick to the face which knocked Akiyama out. The match was ruled a knockout victory for Misaki, but Akiyama contended that one or both of his hands were on the mat at the time of the kick, which would make the kick a foul under the Yarennoka! rules. After reviewing video of the knockout, the Yarennoka! executive committee agreed; the official result was changed to a no contest.

Ultimate Fighting Championship
On February 24, 2009 it was announced on the official UFC website that Akiyama had signed a deal with the company. Akiyama made his debut against Alan Belcher at UFC 100 on July 11. Despite suffering a broken orbital, he won by split decision (30–27, 28–29, 29–28). It was the 1st fight in Akiyama's career that went to the judges' score cards. The bout was also awarded "Fight of the Night" honors, granting both fighters a record-setting $100,000 bonus each.

On May 30, 2009 Akiyama opened a new gym in Tokyo, Japan. The 'Akiyama Dojo' has Judo and MMA halls, 30 tatami mats and three octagonal cages.

Akiyama joined Xtreme Couture for the month of October 2009 to work on his striking skills. Akiyama was expected to face MMA legend and former PRIDE Middleweight Champion Wanderlei Silva on February 21, 2010 at UFC 110, but Silva instead faced British striker Michael Bisping on the card, winning via unanimous decision. At the Post-fight conference, UFC President Dana White stated that Akiyama had requested to fight Silva for a while and has refused to fight other opponents, after which both fighters verbally agreed to fight.

Akiyama was expected to face Silva on July 3, 2010 at UFC 116. Wanderlei had to pull out on June 22, 2010 due to fractured ribs suffered in training. Chris Leben was chosen as a replacement. Despite controlling the majority of the fight with effective strikes and solid Judo takedowns, Akiyama became fatigued after the first round and lost via triangle choke with just twenty seconds left in the third round. His loss to Leben was his first official loss in five years.

Akiyama lost to Michael Bisping on October 16, 2010 at UFC 120 by unanimous decision. In preparation for his fight with Bisping, Akiyama switched to Jackson’s Submission Fighting in Albuquerque, New Mexico. It is unclear whether the switch is permanent. Even though Akiyama lost to Bisping, he rocked him in the first round. He earned his third "Fight of the Night" honors. He has now earned "Fight of the Night" honors for all three of his UFC appearances.

Akiyama was briefly scheduled to face Chael Sonnen on March 19, 2011 at UFC 128, but, due to Sonnen's suspension, the fight was scrapped. Akiyama was later scheduled to face Nate Marquardt at the same event, but pulled out due to the 2011 Tōhoku earthquake and tsunami and was replaced by Dan Miller.

Akiyama was defeated by Vitor Belfort at UFC 133 via KO (Punches) in the first round. This defeat marked the third straight loss for Akiyama in the UFC. Following the fight, Dana White stated that Akiyama most likely would not be cut from the organization if he agrees to move down to welterweight. As of September 3, 2011, Akiyama has stated he will move down a weight class, allowing him to stay in the UFC. On November 3, 2011, a picture of Akiyama had circled the web of his body frame as a welterweight.

Akiyama faced Jake Shields on February 26, 2012 at UFC 144. He lost the fight via unanimous decision (30-27, 30-27, 30-27). During the bout, Akiyama was able to utilize multiple judo techniques which was praised as the main highlights of the fight; despite losing the decision.

Akiyama was expected to face Thiago Alves on July 21, 2012 at UFC 149. However, Akiyama was forced out of the bout with an injury.

Akiyama had made an appearance alongside UFC featherweight Hatsu Hioki during the Q&A session for UFC on Fuel TV 8. During the Q&A, Akiyama stated he was thinking about returning for another bout as long as he has a free schedule as well as being matched against a well-known opponent that would interest fans. Akiyama also stated he still has interest in fighting Wanderlei Silva, a bout scheduled for UFC 116 but was changed when Silva had to pull out of the fight due to injury.

After over two and a half years away from the sport, Akiyama returned from his self-imposed hiatus on September 20, 2014 at UFC Fight Night 52. He was originally scheduled to face Kyle Noke on the card. However, Noke was forced out of the bout with a knee injury and replaced by Amir Sadollah. Akiyama won the fight via unanimous decision.

After another year away from the sport, Akiyama returned to face Alberto Mina on November 28, 2015 at UFC Fight Night 79. He lost the back-and-forth fight via split decision.

ONE Championship
After three years from his previous bout, Akiyama announced his contract with ONE Championship. Akiyama faced Agilan Thani in a co-headliner bout at ONE Championship: Legendary Quest on June 20, 2019. He lost the bout via unanimous decision.

Akiyama faced Sherif Mohamed at ONE Championship 109: King of the Jungle on February 28, 2020. Akiyama won the fight via knockout in the first round, his first stoppage via strikes in nearly 13 years.

Akiyama was initially scheduled to face Mohammad Karaki at ONE on TNT 3 on April 21, 2021. However, the bout was cancelled and Akiyama was supposed to face Eduard Folayang at ONE on TNT 4 on April 28, 2021. But due to suffering an injury during training camp, Akiyama pulled out of the fight and the bout was subsequently scrapped.

A 46-year-old Akiyama faced Shinya Aoki at ONE: X on March 26, 2022. After getting dominated for most of the first round, nearly getting submitted, Akiyama went on to win by technical knockout in the second round. Akiyama announced that he plans to fight till he is 50.

Fighting style
As a former gold medalist in the sport, Akiyama stands out in MMA for his style of judo. His usage of it is mainly defensive, as he rarely indulges in the art's signature throws. Instead, Akiyama focuses mostly on defending takedowns in order to brawl with his opponent or getting top position on the mat to perform ground and pound. However, he has shown skill with harai goshi, kosoto gake and ouchi gari/osoto gari combinations, as well as the more complex uchi mata.
Also, thanks to his knowledge of grip fighting, he is often successful in catching low kicks and following with sharp counterpunching.

Participation in Physical-100 
Akiyima, affectionately nicknamed by fans as 'Sexyama', achieved notoriety by participating in the Korean hit show, Physical-100 released on Netflix on 24 January 2023. He was lauded for his excellence performance and leadership at the age of 47 and placed a very respectable 20 out of 100 contestants, before ultimately being eliminated in the round entitled ‘The Punishment of Sisyphus'. Akiyima had to push a 100-kilogram boulder up a hill in a battle against three other top sportsmen.

Having won the admiration of fans and participants alike with his physical prowess and respectful conduct, Akiyima gracefully said these words before destroying his bust:

“I’m 48 in Korean age this year, and I wanted to show middle-aged men around the world that I can go head-to-head with younger athletes and beat them. That’s why I applied. I wanted to win.

“Still, ranking in the final 20 out of 100, I gave the other middle-aged guys watching just a little hope and courage. Thanks so much to ‘Physical: 100’ for giving me that role. 

“Us middle-aged men can do it. We still got it. That’s all.”

Personal life
Choo Sung-hoon's great-grandfather, Choo Jeong-won, was born in Jeju County, Jeollanam-do, Korean Empire (now Jeju City). During the Imperial Japanese occupation of Korea, Choo Jeong-won and his family sailed to Japan and adopted Japanese names to help settle in. In March 2009, Akiyama married famous Japanese fashion model Shiho Yano (also known as SHIHO in Japan) whom he had been dating since January 2007. The couple have a daughter, Choo Sarang, who was born on October 24, 2011.
Akiyama and Sarang starred in the reality show, The Return of Superman, covering their father-daughter relationship.

He names Heavyweight Champion boxer Mike Tyson as his hero and holds a University degree in Commerce. He is close friends with South Korean actor Jang Keun-suk. In September 2015, Akiyama also appeared as a guest on 2 Days & 1 Night.

Championships and accomplishments
 HERO'S
K-1 HERO Light Heavyweight Grand Prix World Champion
 Ultimate Fighting Championship 
Fight of the Night (Three times)  
ONE Championship
 Performance of the Night (One time)

Mixed martial arts record

|-
| Win
|align=center| 16–7 (2)
|Shinya Aoki
| TKO (punches)
|ONE: X
|
|align=center| 2
|align=center| 1:50 
| Kallang, Singapore
|
|-
| Win
| align=center | 15–7 (2)
| Sherif Mohamed
| KO (punch)
| ONE: King of the Jungle
| 
| align=center | 1
| align=center | 3:04
| Kallang, Singapore
| 
|-
| Loss 
| align=center | 14–7 (2)
| Agilan Thani
| Decision (unanimous)
| ONE: Legendary Quest
| 
| align=center | 3
| align=center | 5:00
| Shanghai, China
| 
|-
| Loss 
| align=center | 14–6 (2)
| Alberto Mina
| Decision (split)
| UFC Fight Night: Henderson vs. Masvidal
| 
| align=center | 3
| align=center | 5:00
| Seoul, South Korea
| 
|-
| Win
| align=center | 14–5 (2)
| Amir Sadollah
| Decision (unanimous)
| UFC Fight Night: Hunt vs. Nelson
| 
| align=center | 3
| align=center | 5:00
| Saitama, Japan
| 
|-
| Loss
| align=center | 13–5 (2)
| Jake Shields
| Decision (unanimous)
| UFC 144
| 
| align=center | 3
| align=center | 5:00
| Saitama, Japan
| 
|-
| Loss
| align=center | 13–4 (2)
| Vitor Belfort
| KO (punches)
| UFC 133
| 
| align=center | 1
| align=center | 1:52
| Philadelphia, Pennsylvania, United States
| 
|-
| Loss
| align=center | 13–3 (2)
| Michael Bisping
| Decision (unanimous)
| UFC 120
| 
| align=center | 3
| align=center | 5:00
| London, England
| 
|-
| Loss
| align=center | 13–2 (2)
| Chris Leben
| Submission (triangle choke)
| UFC 116
| 
| align=center | 3
| align=center | 4:40
| Las Vegas, United States
| 
|-
| Win
| align=center | 13–1 (2)
| Alan Belcher
| Decision (split)
| UFC 100
| 
| align=center | 3
| align=center | 5:00
| Las Vegas, United States
| 
|-
| Win
| align=center | 12–1 (2)
| Masanori Tonooka
| Submission (armbar)
| Dream 6: Middleweight Grand Prix 2008 Final Round
| 
| align=center | 1
| align=center | 6:26
| Saitama, Japan
| 
|-
| Win
| align=center | 11–1 (2)
| Katsuyori Shibata
| Technical Submission (Ezekiel choke)
| Dream 5: Lightweight Grand Prix 2008 Final Round
| 
| align=center | 1
| align=center | 6:34
| Osaka, Japan
| 
|-
| NC
| align=center | 10–1 (2)
| Kazuo Misaki
| NC (overturned)
| Yarennoka!
| 
| align=center | 1
| align=center | 7:48
| Saitama, Japan
| 
|-
| Win
| align=center | 10–1 (1)
| Denis Kang
| KO (punch)
| Hero's 2007 in Korea
| 
| align=center | 1
| align=center | 4:45
| Seoul, South Korea
| 
|-
| NC
| align=center | 9–1 (1)
| Kazushi Sakuraba
| NC (overturned)
| K-1 Premium 2006 Dynamite!!
| 
| align=center | 1
| align=center | 5:37
| Osaka, Japan
| 
|-
| Win
| align=center | 9–1
| Melvin Manhoef
| Submission (armbar)
| Hero's 7
| 
| align=center | 1
| align=center | 1:58
| Yokohama, Japan
| 
|-
| Win
| align=center | 8–1
| Kestutis Smirnovas
| TKO (punches)
| Hero's 7
| 
| align=center | 1
| align=center | 3:01
| Yokohama, Japan
| 
|-
| Win
| align=center | 7–1
| Taiei Kin
| Technical Submission (armbar)
| Hero's 6
| 
| align=center | 1
| align=center | 2:01
| Tokyo, Japan
| 
|-
| Win
| align=center | 6–1
| Katsuhiko Nagata
| KO (spinning back kick)
| Hero's 5
| 
| align=center | 1
| align=center | 2:25
| Tokyo, Japan
| 
|-
| Win
| align=center | 5–1
| Tokimitsu Ishizawa
| Submission (Ezekiel choke)
| Hero's 4
| 
| align=center | 2
| align=center | 1:41
| Tokyo, Japan
| 
|-
| Win
| align=center | 4–1
| Masakatsu Okuda
| KO (slam and punches)
| Hero's 2005 in Seoul
| 
| align=center | 1
| align=center | 3:31
| Seoul, South Korea
| 
|-
| Win
| align=center | 3–1
| Michael Lerma
| TKO (punches)
| K-1: World MAX 2005
| 
| align=center | 1
| align=center | 2:47
| Tokyo, Japan
| 
|-
| Win
| align=center | 2–1
| Carl Toomey
| Submission (armbar)
| Hero's 2
| 
| align=center | 1
| align=center | 0:59
| Tokyo, Japan
| 
|-
| Loss
| align=center | 1–1
| Jérôme Le Banner
| KO (knees)
| Hero's 1
| 
| align=center | 1
| align=center | 2:24
| Saitama, Japan
| 
|-
| Win
| align=center | 1–0
| Francois Botha
| Submission (armbar)
| K-1 Premium 2004 Dynamite!!
| 
| align=center | 1
| align=center | 1:54
| Osaka, Japan
|

Judo competition record

Filmography

Television show

Web shows

See also
 List of current ONE fighters
 List of male mixed martial artists

References

External links

 
 DREAM Profile

1975 births
Living people
Asian Games medalists in judo
Japanese male mixed martial artists
Middleweight mixed martial artists
Mixed martial artists utilizing judo
Mixed martial artists utilizing Gaidojutsu
Japanese male judoka
Sportspeople from Osaka
Japanese people of Korean descent
Zainichi Korean people
Naturalized citizens of Japan
Judoka at the 2002 Asian Games
Asian Games gold medalists for Japan
Medalists at the 2002 Asian Games
Ultimate Fighting Championship male fighters